Perelyubsky District is an administrative and municipal district (raion), one of the thirty-eight in Saratov Oblast, Russia. It is located in the east of the oblast. Its administrative center is the rural locality (a selo) of Perelyub. Population: 14,747 (2010 Census);  The population of Perelyub accounts for 32.4% of the district's total population.

References

Notes

Sources

External links
Official website of Perelyubsky District
Unofficial website of Perelyubsky District

Districts of Saratov Oblast

